Benjamin David Somoza (born August 16, 1979) is a former American soccer player.

Career
After four seasons at the University of Washington, Somoza spent the 2002 season with Portland Timbers before joining their rivals Seattle Sounders where he won the 2005 USL First Division title.

In 2009, he served as an interim assistant coach for the University of Washington while Brandon Prideaux was finishing up his final season of his career with the Chicago Fire.

Honors

Edmonds Woodway High School
4 year varsity letter winner - Soccer
3 year varsity letter winner - Basketball
1st Team All Wesco soccer selection - 1996, 1997, 1998
Led 1998 team in points (17), goals (5), assists (7)
Seattle Times' North End Athlete of the Year - 1998
Holds Edmonds Woodway High School career record for assists

University of Washington
4-year letter winner - 1998-2002
2 time Team Captain
Helped lead team to NCAA tournament - 1998-2002
1st Team All-Pac-10 honoree as a Junior (started in all 20 games)
Selected to the National Amateur Team - 1999
Won 3 league championships in 1998, 1999, and the inaugural Pac-10 crown in 2000
2nd Team All Far West Region - 2001
1st Team All-Pac-10 - 2000, 2001
6th all time UW assist leader with 23 assists
58-21-2 record at University of Washington over 4 years

Seattle Sounders
 USL First Division Championship (1): 2005

References

External links
 University of Washington bio

1979 births
Living people
American soccer players
American soccer coaches
Washington Huskies men's soccer players
Seattle Sounders Select players
Portland Timbers (2001–2010) players
Seattle Sounders (1994–2008) players
Association football midfielders
Soccer players from Washington (state)
USL League Two players
A-League (1995–2004) players
USL First Division players